Rudraprayag Legislative Assembly constituency is one of the 70 electoral Uttarakhand Legislative Assembly constituencies of Uttarakhand state in India. It includes Rudraprayag area of Ruraprayag Tehsil.

Rudraprayag Legislative Assembly constituency is a part of Garhwal (Lok Sabha constituency).

Election results

2022

References

External links
  

Rudraprayag district
Assembly constituencies of Uttarakhand